Lansdown is a 2001 dark comedy film written and directed by Tom Zuber. Paul Shields stars as Jake Jorgenson, a criminal defense attorney in the fictional town of Lansdown, New Jersey.

The film won Best First Feature at the Cinequest Film Festival.

References

External links 
 

2001 films
Films set in New Jersey
Films shot in New Jersey
2001 black comedy films
American black comedy films
2001 comedy films
2000s English-language films
2000s American films